Othippia is a genus of true weevils in the beetle family Curculionidae. There are more than 20 described species in Othippia.

Species
These 26 species belong to the genus Othippia:

 Othippia affinis Heller, 1894
 Othippia albilateralis Heller, 1925
 Othippia albilateris Heller, 1925
 Othippia arcufer Hustache, 1932
 Othippia continentalis Heller, 1894
 Othippia distigma Pascoe, 1874
 Othippia funebris Pascoe, 1874
 Othippia gibbicollis Hustache, 1932
 Othippia guttula Pascoe, 1885
 Othippia impesca Hell., 1921
 Othippia impexa Heller, 1922
 Othippia jubata Pascoe, 1874
 Othippia luteipes Hustache, 1956
 Othippia micros Hustache, 1932
 Othippia minuscula Hustache, 1932
 Othippia minuta Heller, 1894
 Othippia murina Heller, 1925
 Othippia picticollis Heller, 1929
 Othippia podagrica Pascoe, 1874
 Othippia proletaria Pascoe, 1874
 Othippia pygmaea Hustache, 1932
 Othippia revocata Heller, 1894
 Othippia semisuturalis Hustache, 1956
 Othippia serratula Heller, 1894
 Othippia unicolor Heller, 1894
 Othippia urbana Faust, 1898

References

Further reading

 
 
 

Weevils